TAESA (Transportes Aéreos Ejecutivos S.A.) was a low cost airline with its headquarters in No. 27 of Hangar Zone C on the grounds of Mexico City International Airport in Mexico City, Mexico.

History

The airline, owned by Carlos Hank González legally represented by Alberto Abed Schekaiban, was established on April 27, 1988, operating executive business aircraft and later on in 1989 received their first Boeing 727-100 which was used to launch regularly scheduled passenger service. TAESA began growing rapidly using 727s in airline service.  In 1991, they received their first Boeing 757-200 and became the first commercial airline in Mexico to operate this aircraft type.  Also in 1991, several Boeing 737-300s were added with additional 757s and a sole Boeing 767-300 being added as well to a fleet of Boeing 737-200/300/400/500 jetliners.  TAESA was at that time the first Boeing 737-500 operator in Latin America. During the first half of the 1990s, TAESA was quite successful flying cargo for DHL and Serpaprosa with their Boeing 727-100Cs.  Also during this time, several 737s were leased to Garuda Indonesia to make Asian flights. Meanwhile, they won charter contracts from companies such as Apple Vacations. By 1992, the airline was operating many charter flights to cities in Canada, Europe and the USA. In the domestic market, TAESA started a fare war with the main carriers, Aeroméxico and Mexicana.

In 1995, TAESA launched "crediTAESA", a program that allowed its passengers to fly with a minimum down payment and 12 monthly repayments. The airline also launched a simple frequent flyer program in that year, which rewarded travelers with one free ticket per every five booked. A large percentage of ticket sales were made at shopping malls and supermarkets, where TAESA held booths. At its peak, TAESA had a market share of 27% of the Mexican domestic airline market.

After the 1995 downturn in the Mexican economy, they removed newer model jetliners in favor of older Boeing 727-100 and 727-200 aircraft and also added Douglas DC-9-15s, McDonnell Douglas DC-10-30s and later a pair of Airbus A300B4s.

TAESA was the first Mexican airline to fly scheduled passenger service to Japan with two flights a week operated during a four-month time period in 1995.

The airline was having regulatory and maintenance issues for quite some time with a constant anti-labor politics after the accident of Flight 725 resulted in the suspension of its license, hastening the airline's demise. The airline had over 43 serious violations of Mexican aviation safety laws upon its suspension in 1999.

After the accident of Flight 725, the airline went through a huge inspection on behalf of the Mexican General Directorate of Civil Aeronautics and was subject to comply certain security issues to resume operations. However, unable to repay debts of US$400 million, the airline declared bankruptcy on February 21, 2000. A last-minute deal with potential investors, including Continental Airlines, to buy TAESA ultimately failed.

Some of the staff, assets, and routes were taken over by Líneas Aéreas Azteca, which was established on 9 May 2000 and started operations on 1 June 2000, inheriting TAESA's domestic services, but operating them with modern Boeing 737-700 aircraft.

TAESA was one of Mexico's first low-cost carriers. 
World boxing champion Julio César Chávez was one of TAESA's share-holders; he used to advertise the airline during his boxing fights, having TAESA's name and logo emblazoned on his trunks.

Affiliates
Aviación del Noroeste
LaTur
NSW New Southways- Cargo division
Puebla Air Lines

Destinations
TAESA served the following cities in Mexico: 
ACA – Acapulco, Guerrero, Mexico – Alvarez International
AGU – Aguascalientes, Aguascalientes – Lic. Jesús Terán Peredo International 
BJX – León/Guanajuato, Guanajuato, Mexico – Del Bajio
CEN – Ciudad Obregón, Sonora, Mexico 
CUN – Cancun, Quintana Roo, Mexico
CUU – Chihuahua, Mexico – General Roberto Fierro Villalobos
CJS – Ciudad Juarez, Chihuahua, Mexico – Abraham Gonzalez International
CUL – Culiacan, Sinaloa, Mexico - Bachigualato Federal
CZM – Cozumel, Quintana Roo, Mexico
GDL – Guadalajara, Jalisco, Mexico – Miguel Hidalgo International
HMO – Hermosillo, Sonora, Mexico – General Ignacio Pesqueira Garcia
LOM - Lagos de Moreno, Jaliso, Mexico -  Francisco P.V. y R. 
MID – Mérida, Yucatán, Mexico – Mérida International
MEX – Mexico City, Distrito Federal, Mexico – Benito Juarez International 
MTY – Monterrey, Nuevo León, Mexico – Escobedo
MLM – Morelia, Michoacan, Mexico – General Francisco J. Mujica
PVR – Puerto Vallarta, Jalisco, Mexico – Gustavo Diaz Ordaz
SLW – Saltillo, Coahuila, Mexico – Plan de Guadalupe International
TAP – Tapachula, Chiapas, Mexico – Tapachula International
TIJ – Tijuana, Baja California, Mexico – General Abelardo L. Rodríguez
TRC – Torreon, Coahuila, Mexico – Francisco Sarabia
UPN – Uruapan, Michoacan, Mexico – Lic. Ignacio Lopez Rayon International
ZCL – Zacatecas, Zacatecas, Mexico – La Calera

Airports served in the United States:
EGE – Vail/Eagle, CO, USA – Eagle County Regional
IAD – Washington, VA, USA – Dulles Airport
JFK – New York, NY, USA – John F. Kennedy International
LAS – Las Vegas, NV, USA – McCarran Airport
LAX – Los Angeles, CA, USA – Los Angeles International
LRD – Laredo, TX, USA – International
MIA – Miami, FL, USA – Miami International
OAK – Oakland, CA, USA – Oakland International 
ORD – Chicago, IL, USA – O'Hare International

Airports served in Puerto Rico:
BQN – Aguadilla, Puerto Rico – Rafael Hernandez Airport

Airports served in Japan:
NRT – Tokyo, Japan – Narita Airport

Airports served in Germany:
SXF – Berlin, Germany – Schönefeld Airport
FRA – Frankfurt, Germany – Rhein – Main International 
CGN – Köln, Germany – Köln Bonn 
DUS – Düsseldorf, Germany – Düsseldorf 
LEJ – Leipzig, Germany – Leipzig Airport
MUC – Munich, Germany – Franz – Josef Strauss

Codeshare agreements 
TAESA operated code sharing services with the following airlines:
Aviación del Noroeste
Aviacsa
LaTur
Puebla Air Lines
Servicios Aéreos Rutas Oriente

Fleet
TAESA's aircraft were in an all-economy configuration. Their commercial fleet throughout its history included the following airplanes:

Accidents and incidents
Various incidents damaged the airline's image:

On June 18, 1994, when the United States hosted soccer World Cup, a Learjet 25 crashed into trees while approaching Dulles International Airport from the south. All 12 on board were killed in the accident. The cause was ruled as pilot error due to an inexperienced crew.
In April 1997 a McDonnell Douglas DC-10 had sustained damage in a landing in Santo Domingo.
On November 9, 1999, TAESA Flight 725 covered the Tijuana–Mexico City route with a stop in Uruapan, Michoacán, Mexico. A McDonnell Douglas DC-9-31 used to fly this route. Flight 725 went down a few minutes after leaving the Uruapan International Airport en route to Mexico City. 18 people were killed in the accident, which prompted inquiries regarding the airline's safety and maintenance procedures.

See also

List of defunct airlines of Mexico

References

External links

TAESA (Archive)
rzjets Data
Timetables at Airtimes
Timetable Images
AirSafe accident report
Accident reports
TAESA pictures in AirlinersNet
TAESA fleet

Defunct airlines of Mexico
Airlines established in 1988
Airlines disestablished in 2000
2000 disestablishments in Mexico
Mexican companies established in 1988